The 1917 North Armagh by-election was held on 22 November 1917.  The by-election was held due to the incumbent Conservative MP, Sir William Moore, becoming a Judge of the High Court of Justice in Ireland. It was won by the Conservative candidate William Allen, who was unopposed.

References

1917 elections in the United Kingdom
By-elections to the Parliament of the United Kingdom in County Armagh constituencies
Unopposed by-elections to the Parliament of the United Kingdom (need citation)
20th century in County Armagh
1917 elections in Ireland